The 2004–05 Washington Huskies men's basketball team represented the University of Washington in the 2004–05 NCAA Division I men's basketball season. This was head coach Lorenzo Romar's 3rd season at Washington. The Huskies played their home games at Bank of America Arena and are members of the Pacific-10 Conference. They finished the season 29–6, 14–4 in Pac-10 play and they captured the Pac–10 Tournament title and an automatic bid to the 2005 NCAA Division I men's basketball tournament. They earned the No. 1 seed in the West Region, defeating Montana in the first round and Pacific in the second round before losing to Louisville in the Sweet Sixteen.

2004–05 Team

Roster
Source

Coaching staff

2004–05 Schedule and Results

|-
!colspan=9| Exhibition

|-
!colspan=9| Regular Season

|-
!colspan=9| Pac-10 men's tournament

|-
!colspan=9| NCAA men's tournament

References

Washington Huskies men's basketball seasons
Washington
Washington
Washington
Washington
Pac-12 Conference men's basketball tournament championship seasons